The Congo River is a river in Africa.

Congo River or Río Congo may also refer to:

 Congo River (Panama), a river in Panama
 Congo River (Ecuador), a river in Ecuador
 Congo River, Beyond Darkness, a 2005 Belgian documentary by Thierry Michel
 Congo Run, a stream in Hancock County, West Virginia, U.S.
 Río Congo, Darién, a corregimiento (subdivision of a district) in Panama
 Congo River Rapids (Alton_Towers), a water rapids ride at Alton Towers

See also 
 Congo (disambiguation)